The Third Federal Electoral District of Quintana Roo (III Distrito Electoral Federal de Quintana Roo) is one of the 300 Electoral Districts into which Mexico is divided for the purpose of elections to the federal Chamber of Deputies and one of three such districts in the state of Quintana Roo.

It elects one deputy to the lower house of Congress for each three-year legislative period, by means of the first past the post system.

District territory
The Third District was created under the 2005 districting scheme, from the portion of the Second District corresponding to the urban area of the municipality of Benito Juárez: i.e., the city and resort of Cancún.

The district's head town (cabecera distrital), where results from individual polling stations are gathered together and collated, is the city of Cancún.

It returned its first deputy to Congress in the 2006 general election.

Deputies returned to Congress from this district

LX Legislature
2006–2009: Yolanda Garmendia Hernández (PAN)
LXI Legislature
2009–2012: Carlos Joaquín González (PRI)

References and notes

Federal electoral districts of Mexico
Quintana Roo